Events in the year 1875 in India.

Incumbents
Thomas Baring, 1st Earl of Northbrook, Viceroy

Events
National income - ₹3,628 million
Muhammadan Anglo-Oriental College, founded by Sir Syed Ahmed Khan in Aligarh (now Uttar Pradesh); later became Aligarh Muslim University in 1920.
Albert Edward, the Prince of Wales, arrives in British India, on an official visit representing his mother Queen Victoria, the Empress of India, remaining there until the following year.
8 November – The Prince of Wales visits Bombay. Establishment of Arya SAMAJ
10 April - The Arya Samaj was founded by Swami Dayanand Saraswati.

Law
Majority Act
Tolls On Roads & Bridges Act

Births
31 October – Sardar Vallabhbhai Patel, political and social leader (died 1950).
22 December – Nanda Kishore Bal, poet (died 1928).

References

 
India
Years of the 19th century in India